State Highway 174 (SH 174) is a state highway in Texas that connects Meridian and Burleson.

Route description
SH 174 begins in Bosque County at an intersection with  SH 22 in Meridian. The route travels northward out of the city and through Morgan. It briefly enters Hill County, passing to the north of Lake Whitney and the town of Blum, before crossing into Johnson County. Heading north into Cleburne, SH 174 has agreement with  SH 171 and  FM 4 through the city's downtown, where the routes cross  Bus. US 67. After separating from SH 171 and FM 4, SH 174 has an interchange with the  US 67 expressway before heading northward out of the city. The route passes through Joshua and curves to the northeast into Burleson, where SH 174 ends at an interchange with Interstate 35W.

History
The original routing of SH 174 was designated on August 4, 1932 from Iredell to Walnut Springs. On October 22, 1935, it extended to Cleburne, replacing what was previously SH 144T.  On September 26, 1939, it extended to the former US 81 near Burleson, replacing part of SH 2A. On December 3, 1940, SH 353 was designated on a newly proposed road from Cleburne to Meridian, with the section of SH 353 that does not include the bridge across the Brazos River and the section of SH 174 from Cleburne to Iredell being cancelled upon completion of the bridge across the Brazos River. On June 11, 1945, FM 167 was designated from Cleburne to the Hill–Johnson County Line, and from the Hill–Bosque County Line in Morgan to Meridian, but SH 353 was not cancelled. On August 23, 1945, FM 167 was extended from the Hill/Johnson County Line to Hill/Bosque County Line in Morgan, closing the gap. SH 353 was cancelled because the route was identical to the route of FM 167. On September 27, 1946, FM 167 was changed back to SH 353. On June 29, 1950, the bridge was completed on SH 353, and when adequate facilities for highway travel were built on SH 353, SH 353 was to become part of SH 174. The old route of SH 174 from Cleburne to Iredell was to be cancelled. On August 20, 1952, work was completed; SH 174 was rerouted along SH 353 from Cleburne to Meridian, while the former segment from Iredell to Walnut Springs was transferred to FM 927 and PR 21, with the rest being given to the counties.

Major intersections

References

174
Transportation in Bosque County, Texas
Transportation in Hill County, Texas
Transportation in Johnson County, Texas